Chong-Sik Lee (July 30, 1931 – August 17, 2021) was a Korean-American political scientist specializing in East Asian studies. Together with his co-author Robert A. Scalapino, he won the 1974 Woodrow Wilson Foundation Award of the American Political Science Association for the best book on government, politics or international affairs.

Early life and education
Lee was born in Anju, Korea, Japan, and escaped from North Korea to South Korea, then moving to the United States. He was one of the first Koreans to attend and graduate from the University of California, Los Angeles (UCLA). He earned his master's degree in political science from UCLA and his Ph.D. in political science from the University of California, Berkeley.

Career
Korean Studies originated at the University of Pennsylvania in 1963 when Chong-Sik Lee, one of the nation's leading analysts of Korean affairs, joined the political science department. Lee was Emeritus Professor of Political Science at the University of Pennsylvania and Eminent Scholar at Kyung Hee University.

Lee’s research of modern Korean history began in 1957 when he began co-authoring Communism in Korea (University of California Press) with Robert A. Scalapino. Published in 1973 after 16 years of research and writing, Communism in Korea was the winner of the Woodrow Wilson Foundation Award of the American Political Science Association for the best book published in the United States in 1974 in government, politics or international affairs.

Communism in Korea was revised and reprinted as North Korea: Building of the Monolithic State in 2017.

Lee’s academic career includes works about Korea’s history of communism, the division of the Korean Peninsula, and the origins of the Republic of Korea. He also researched major figures in modern Korean history such as Syngman Rhee, the first president of Korea (1948-1960); Lyuh Woon-hyung, a Korean politician and reunification activist in the 1940s; and Park Chung-hee, the third president of Korea (1963-1979) who seized power through a military coup. In particular, his works on Korea-Japan relations, communist movements in Manchuria, and the international relations of East Asia have been translated into many languages and are considered classics in East Asian studies.

Having devoted more than five decades to collecting historical records, Lee remarked, “By reading various records, I can gain insight as to why certain events occurred, what led to the occurrence of these events, and why historical figures took particular actions.” Lee often told his students that “the true advancement of scholarship is only possible through a repetitive process of inquiry” and advised them to “accept new theories but to investigate with curiosity when these theories are unconvincing.”

He was the author of The Politics of Korean Nationalism (University of California Press, 1963) and Kim Kyu-sik ui saengae (The Life of Kim Kyu-sik), Seoul: Shingu Munhwasa, 1974. Other books include Park Chung Hee: From Poverty to Power (KHU Press) and A 21st Century View of Post-Colonial Korea (Kyung Hee University Press). He has contributed to China Quarterly, Asian Survey, Journal of Asian Studies, Journal of International Affairs and other periodicals. Lee died on August 17, 2021 at the age of 90.

Awards
2011: Kyung-Ahm Prize, Kyung-Ahm Education & Cultural Foundation

References 

1931 births
2021 deaths
South Korean historians
Historians of Korea
People from South Pyongan
South Korean political scientists
University of Pennsylvania faculty
University of California, Los Angeles alumni
University of California, Berkeley alumni
South Korean emigrants to the United States